Eurocross is an annual international cross country running competition which takes place in Diekirch, Luxembourg in February. It is one of the IAAF permit meetings which serve as qualifying events for the IAAF World Cross Country Championships. It is sponsored by the ING Group.

First held in 1969, Eurocross is organised by the local athletics club (Celtic) and the course follows near the Stade Municipal in Diekirch. There are two major races: a 10.2 km race for men and a 5.3 km race for women. In addition to these primary competitions, there are races for runners of various youth levels, as well as a popular, mass race for amateurs.

The course follows a steep incline up a hill on a stepped dirt path, which then loops back on to downhill section. The race takes place over a number of laps thus the uphill and downhill sections can make for a particularly difficult cross country course.

The main races typically attract international-calibre athletes from Europe and Africa. Past men's winners include IAAF World Cross Country Championships medallist Josephat Machuka and European Championships medallists Mustafa Mohamed and Carsten Jørgensen. The women's side has featured Gabriela Szabo (an Olympic and world champion), 1993 World Cross Country champion Albertina Dias and Dorcus Inzikuru, a steeplechase world champion. The Eurocross typically gives out over US $12,500 in total prize money for each meeting.

The 2010 race, which was the 40th edition of the competition, was held simultaneously with the 94th Luxembourg national cross country championships.

Past senior race winners
Key:

Note: The women's course was shorter than the typical 5.3 km between 1990 and 2005.

References

External links
Past medallists from Celtic Diekirch website

Cross country running competitions
Athletics in Luxembourg
Recurring sporting events established in 1969
Sports competitions in Luxembourg
Cross country running in Luxembourg
Annual sporting events in Luxembourg
1969 establishments in Luxembourg
Winter events in Luxembourg